John M. Crowther (March 3, 1939 – April 27, 2018) was an American artist and writer known for the cartoons he produced for Mad magazine, oil portraits, and his writing for television and film.

Career
Crowther was born to Florence and Bosley Crowther, a film critic for The New York Times. In 1957, he graduated from the George School of Bucks County, Pennsylvania, followed by Princeton in 1961. He studied art and theater in school, and had two successful performances on Broadway. His father's interest in Italian foreign films led him to furthering acting in Italy. In total he is credited with writing nine movies and television series; and at least six books. Outside of writing, Crowther performed in his biographical one-man shows that toured the United States called Einstein: A Stage Portrait. and taught painting with his wife in Tuscany, Italy. He was a member of the Portrait Society of America.

Bibliography

Novels
 Firebase (1975)

Comics collections
 Out of Order (2008)
 Face Off (2012)
 Harley and Bear Going Nowhere Half Fast (2015)

Children's books
 How the Waif Bunny Saved the Boy (2009), illustrator
 The Man In the Red Bandanna (2013) written by Honor Crowther Fagan and illustrated by John M. Crowther, a story about his nephew Welles Crowther, a volunteer firefighter who died during the September 11 attacks

Illustrated works
 101 Souls (2015)

Plays
 Something About a Soldier 1962 (Actor)
 The Martlet’s Tale (Director)
 Affected Memories (Writer)

Films
 Kill and Kill Again (Writer), (1981)
 The Evil That Men Do (Writer), (1984)
 Missing in Action (Writer), (1984)
 Damned River (Writer), (1989)

See also
Robert Crumb
Gary Larson
Lorin Morgan-Richards
Angus Oblong
Marvin Townsend
Gahan Wilson

References

1939 births
2018 deaths
People from New York City
George School alumni
Princeton University alumni
American humorists
Writers from New York City